HMS Gay Bruiser was a Gay-class fast patrol boat of the Royal Navy. She was built by Vosper, Portchester, and launched on 19 December 1952.  She was the third ship to be launched in her class.

The ship was reported to have been at the Wessex Power Units Yard during the early 1960s.

References

Gay-class fast patrol boats
Royal Navy ship names
1952 ships